is a Japanese football player who plays for Kyoto Sanga FC.

Playing career
Kato was born in Ageo on 11 December 1984. He joined J1 League club Urawa Reds from youth team in 2003. Although Reds won the many title 2006 J1 League, 2007 AFC Champions League and so on, he could hardly play in the match behind Ryota Tsuzuki and Norihiro Yamagishi until 2010. He became a regular goalkeeper in 2011 and Reds won the 2nd place in 2011 and 2013 J.League Cup. However he lost his regular position behind Shusaku Nishikawa in 2014. In 2015, he moved to Saitama's cross town rivals, Omiya Ardija in J2 League. He played as regular goalkeeper and Ardija was promoted to J1 end of 2015 season. Although his opportunity to play decreased from 2016, he played many matches while battling with Hitoshi Shiota for the position. However Ardija finished at the bottom place in 2017 season and was relegated to J2. He could not play at all in the match behind Takashi Kasahara in 2018. In 2019, he moved to J2 club Kyoto Sanga FC.

Club statistics

Honours

Club
Urawa Reds
J1 League: 1
 2006
Emperor's Cup: 2
 2005, 2006
J.League Cup: 1
 2003
AFC Champions League: 1
 2007
Japanese Super Cup: 1
 2006

Omiya Ardija
J2 League: 1
 2015

References

External links

Profile at Omiya Ardija
 Yahoo! Sports Profile

1984 births
Living people
Association football people from Saitama Prefecture
Japanese footballers
J1 League players
J2 League players
Urawa Red Diamonds players
Omiya Ardija players
Kyoto Sanga FC players
People from Ageo, Saitama
Association football goalkeepers